Thomas C. Christensen (born 1953) is an American cinematographer, film director, and writer best known for his work on films related to the history of the Church of Jesus Christ of Latter-day Saints (LDS Church), including Joseph Smith: The Prophet of the Restoration, Gordon B. Hinckley: A Giant Among Men, 17 Miracles, and Ephraim's Rescue. He has made films about the Martin and Willie handcart companies who traversed the plains toward the Salt Lake Valley in late 1856. Christensen is also a member of the American Society of Cinematographers.

Biography
Christensen grew up in Layton, Utah, with nine siblings. He served as a missionary for the LDS Church in Ohio and West Virginia from 1972 to 1974.  He studied filmmaking at Brigham Young University (BYU) and the University of Utah (U of U).

Christensen married his wife, Katy, in 1980. They have two children, Tanner and Tess, both of whom have worked with Christensen on his films. His cousin Ron Tanner has also collaborated with Christensen on his films.

Career
While attending BYU and the U of U, Christensen worked as a part-time cameraman for KSL-TV in Utah for five years. He declined offers to go full-time because he did not want to pursue a career in news. After leaving KSL-TV, Christensen began freelance filmmaking. He credits fellow filmmaker Kieth Merrill as his mentor, with Merrill's children cast in Christensen's The Mouth of Babes.

Films by Christensen have received recognition in several film festivals. His A Pioneer Miracle (also titled In the Arms of Angels) received the Grand Remi Award at the Houston International Film Festival in 2004.Seasons of the Heart, for which he was both director and cinematographer, received multiple awards in film festivals. Christensen has made several films about Joseph Smith, founder of the Latter Day Saint movement (Mormonism).  Among these are Joseph Smith: The Prophet of the Restoration and Emma Smith: My Story, both made in cooperation with Gary Cook. Other Latter-day Saint-themed films include the biography of LDS Church president Gordon B. Hinckley, made following Hinckley's death in 2008. Christensen wrote, directed, and produced Only A Stonecutter, the story of John R. Moyle, father of James H. Moyle. Christensen has also been the cinematographer for a large number of films. These include Rigoletto, The Testaments of One Fold and One Shepherd, Forever Strong, and Outlaw Trail: The Treasure of Butch Cassidy. Having collaborated over the years, T. C. Christensen has been described as the "mentor" of Napoleon Dynamite and Nacho Libre director Jared Hess.

On such films as the first Work and the Glory, Christensen's cinematography was considered by some to be by far the best part of the film. Christensen has also made several IMAX films including Texas: The Big Picture and Ozarks: Legacy and Legend. In the summer of 2011, 17 Miracles was released across the country. The film depicts the Martin and Willie handcart companies as they traveled across the plains to the Salt Lake Valley in 1856. In 2013, Christensen's film Ephraim's Rescue about the life of Ephraim Hanks, a notable rescuer of the Martin Handcart Company, was released to good user reviews, and specifically the addressed events of Hanks bringing the first food supplies to the company, who were snow-bound and starving on the Mormon Trail. In 2015, Christensen wrote and directed The Cokeville Miracle which tells the story of the school bombing in Cokeville, Wyoming, in 1986. In 2016, Christensen began working on Love, Kennedy. It is based on the true story of Ogden, Utah, teenager Kennedy Hansen's battle with Juvenile Batten Disease. The film was released in June 2017.

Christensen is a member of the American Society of Cinematographers.

Filmography
All credits come from Internet Movie Database (IMDb).

See also
 List of famous Latter-day Saints
 Lee Groberg

References

External links
Official website for T.C. Christensen

1953 births
Living people
People from Layton, Utah
American Mormon missionaries in the United States
Brigham Young University alumni
University of Utah alumni
American cinematographers
American Latter Day Saint artists
Latter Day Saints from Utah
Film directors from Utah
Harold B. Lee Library-related 21st century articles